Joeri de Groot (born 29 July 1977 in Spijkenisse) is a Dutch rower. He finished 4th in the men's lightweight coxless four at the 2004 Summer Olympics.

References 
 
 

1977 births
Living people
Dutch male rowers
Rowers at the 2004 Summer Olympics
Olympic rowers of the Netherlands
People from Spijkenisse
World Rowing Championships medalists for the Netherlands
Sportspeople from South Holland